Strigatella tristis is a species of sea snail, a marine gastropod mollusk in the family Mitridae, the mitres or mitre snails.

References

Mitridae
Gastropods described in 1836
Marine gastropods
Taxa named by William Broderip